Carl Gottlieb Ehler (8 September 1685 – 22 November 1753) is considered a mathematician, specifically due to his post as an astronomer in Berlin. He was mayor of the Prussian capital of Danzig from March 1741 until his death.

Career
Much of his early life remains a mystery though it can be inferred from his posts later in life that he received an education given to privileged children. From this education, Ehler ventured on to Paris, and after a brief stay to Berlin, which is where his life changed. In Berlin, he took the post of astronomer, and while researching in Berlin, he met Gottfried Wilhelm Leibniz.  This meeting would forever change Carl Gottlieb. Ehler would eventually send Leibniz both his own astronomical observations as well as a book produced by the converted catholic, Isaac Papin. This helpful correspondence allowed Leibniz to respond to Papin's new use of skeptical arguments. The response was not quite what Papin had hoped for, and Leibniz instead wrote that the use of good logic is the combat of skepticism. 	

Ehler forged a friendship with fellow Prussian mathematician Heinrich Kuhn. This friendship would then blossom into a correspondence with another mathematician, Leonhard Euler. The correspondence initially began in March 1735 with a letter sent by Ehler to Euler.  The correspondence itself is lost, but we can find the main thread of their relationship with Euler's first letter of response. In the letter, Euler talks of the problem of the Seven Bridges of Königsberg, a problem that Ehler brought to Euler's attention. The reason for such an inquiry was the desire by Kuhn and Ehler to encourage mathematical advancements within Prussia. The letter itself reads:

Euler replied to Ehler and Kuhn in April 1736:

While this letter seems to suggest Euler's reluctance to tackle such problem, Kuhn and Ehler had piqued his intellectual curiosity by proposing the solution is part of a new style of mathematics. This enticement is what led the great mathematician to solve the problem and eventually bring to light the new mathematical genre known as geometria situs.

Along with the correspondence between mathematicians, Ehler also takes his place in history by his post as mayor of Danzig. He was mayor three different times, first in 1741, then in 1745, and finally in 1751.  After overseeing the mayoral office of Danzig for the third and final time, Ehler retired to private life and died in 1753.
While not the most important of historical figures, Carl Gottlieb Ehler contributed to the correspondence of key mathematical figures, and their solutions continued the expansion of such mathematical fields like graph theory and number theory.

References

1685 births
1753 deaths
18th-century German mathematicians
18th-century German astronomers
Mayors of Gdańsk
Scientists from Berlin